The Papuan sittella (Daphoenositta papuensis) is one of three species of bird in the family Neosittidae.
It is endemic to New Guinea, where it is found in the highlands.

References

Papuan sittella
Birds of New Guinea
Papuan sittella
Endemic fauna of New Guinea